ㅘ (wa) is one of the Korean hangul. The Unicode for ㅘ is U+3158.

Hangul jamo
Vowel letters